The Argentina men's national 3x3 team is a national basketball team of Argentina, governed by the Confederación Argentina de Basquetbol.
It represents the country in international 3x3 (3 against 3) basketball competitions.

Senior Competitions

Performance at World Championships

See also
Argentina women's national 3x3 team
Argentina mixed national 3x3 team
Argentina national basketball team

References

Men
Men's national 3x3 basketball teams